Cave tetra may refer to different species of fish:

 Astyanax jordani
 Mexican tetra (Astyanax mexicanus')

Characidae